Antwain La'Mar Barbour (born June 27, 1982) is an American former professional basketball player who last played for Hoops Club of the Lebanese Basketball League.

Kentucky High School Sweet 16 State Champion 2000 (Elizabethtown).

MVP Kentucky High School State Tournament 2000.

Career
After playing for Kentucky Wildcats at NCAA, Barbour joined Kentucky Colonels of ABA league in 2004.

Next season he played in the Continental Basketball Association with Yakima Sun Kings and on 2006 he arrives to Spain for finishing the 2005–06 LEB season with UB La Palma. He only played four games, but it was sufficient for signing for Tenerife Rural.

On the team of the island of Tenerife, Barbour played during two seasons and a half becoming one of the most spectacular players of the LEB League. He has got the scoring record at this league, with 50 points against CB Lucentum Alicante.

After two seasons reaching the promotion playoffs to Liga ACB and a half of another one, he leaves Tenerife for signing for Erdemir SK of the Turkish Basketball League. In this first season in Turkey, he becomes runner-up of the Turkish Cup Basketball and finishes the 2008–09 season saving the spot in the TBL. When he arrived, the team was in the 15th position.

On 2009, he returns to Spain to play at Lagun Aro GBC, team of the Liga ACB, the top Spanish basketball league. One year later, Barbour comes back to Zonguldak for playing again at Erdemir SK.

For the 2011–12 season, Antwain Barbour signed with KK Cibona.

On July 3, 2013, Barbour signed with Mersin BB. After a stint in Poland he came back with Mersin BB on December 10, 2014.

References

External links
Antwain Barbour at acb.com
Antwain Barbour at euroleague.net
Antwain Barbour at fiba.com
Antwain Barbour at tblstat.net

1982 births
Living people
ABA League players
American expatriate basketball people in Croatia
American expatriate basketball people in Italy
American expatriate basketball people in Lebanon
American expatriate basketball people in Poland
American expatriate basketball people in Spain
American expatriate basketball people in Turkey
American expatriate basketball people in Venezuela
American men's basketball players
Basketball players from Kentucky
CBA All-Star Game players
Erdemirspor players
Gipuzkoa Basket players
Guaros de Lara (basketball) players
Liga ACB players
Kentucky Wildcats men's basketball players
KK Cibona players
Mersin Büyükşehir Belediyesi S.K. players
People from Elizabethtown, Kentucky
Shooting guards
Tenerife CB players
UB La Palma players
Universiade bronze medalists for the United States
Universiade medalists in basketball
Victoria Libertas Pallacanestro players
Wabash Valley Warriors men's basketball players
Yakima Sun Kings players
Medalists at the 2001 Summer Universiade